Trichocoptodera is a genus of beetles in the family Carabidae, containing the following species:

 Trichocoptodera indica Kirschenhofer, 2010
 Trichocoptodera maculata Louwerens, 1958
 Trichocoptodera piligera (Chaudoir, 1883)

References

Lebiinae